Ksar, Mauritania  is a suburb of Nouakchott and urban commune in western Mauritania. It has a population of 43,531.

References

Communes of Mauritania
Nouakchott

^